The Moors Sundry Act of 1790 was a 1790 advisory resolution passed by South Carolina House of Representatives, clarifying the status of free subjects of the Sultan of Morocco, Mohammed ben Abdallah. The  resolution offered the opinion that free citizens of Morocco were not subject to laws governing blacks and slaves.

Petition from Sundry Free Moors
On January 20, 1790, a petition was presented to the South Carolina House of Representatives from a group of four individuals who were subjects of the Moroccan emperor and residents of the state. They desired that if they happened to commit any fault amenable to be brought to justice, that as subjects to a prince allied with the United States through the Moroccan–American Treaty of Friendship, they would be tried as citizens instead of under the Negro Act of 1740.

The Free Moors, Francis, Daniel, Hammond and Samuel petitioned on behalf of themselves and their wives Fatima, Flora, Sarah and Clarinda. They explained how some years ago while fighting in defense of their country, they and their wives were captured and made prisoners of war by an African king. After this a certain Captain Clark had them delivered to him, promising they would be redeemed by the Moroccan ambassador residing in England, and returned to their country. Instead, he transported them to South Carolina, and sold them for slaves. Since then, "by the greatest industry," they purchased freedom from their respective masters. They requested that as free born subjects of a Prince in alliance with the U.S., that they should not be considered subject to a state law (then in force) known as the negro law. If they be found guilty of any crime or misdemeanor, they would receive a fair trial by lawful jury. The matter was referred to a committee consisting of Justice John Faucheraud Grimké, General Charles Cotesworth Pinckney and Edward Rutledge.

Free Moors Petition: Committee report
Edward Rutledge reported from the committee on the petition on the same day and the House agreed to the report, which read as follows:
{{blockquote|They have Considered the same and are of opinion that no Law of this State can in its Construction or Operation apply to them, and that persons who were Subjects of the Emperor of Morocco being Free in this State are not triable by the Law for the better Ordering and Governing of Negroes and other Slaves.<ref>State Records of South Carolina. Journals of the House of Representatives, 1789-90. Michael Stevens, Christine Allen: Pub. for SCDAH by USC Press: ©1984 SCDAH'House Journal. pp. 373-74</ref>}}

Because the report was not forwarded to the state Senate for concurrence, it did not have the force of law but served as an advisory opinion offering the sense of the House. The report was later published in the Charleston City Gazette and the Charleston State Gazette of South Carolina.

See also
Naturalization Act of 1790
Moorish Science Temple of America

Notes

ReferencesState Records of South Carolina''. Journals of the House of Representatives, 1789-90. Michael Stevens, Christine Allen: Pub. for SCDAH by USC Press: ©1984 SCDAH 1st Ed. Pub. by University of South Carolina Press  (1511 words)

External links
Free Moors of South Carolina

South Carolina law
1790 in South Carolina
Legal history of South Carolina
Moroccan-American history
Slavery in Morocco
Race legislation in the United States
1790 in American law
18th-century Islam
Morocco–United States relations